Middleburg Island or Pulau Middleburg, Tambrauw is an island in the Tambrauw in Southwest Papua province of eastern Indonesia. It's part of the Su Islands (Mios Su) or the Soe Island Group.

See also
Amsterdam Island
Middleburg Airfield

References

External links
 Pacific Wrecks website

Southwest Papua
Tambrauw Regency
Islands of Western New Guinea